was a Japanese fudai daimyō of the Edo period.  He was highly influential in the Tokugawa shogunate under Shōgun Ieshige.

Tadachika served as Kyoto shoshidai from 1717 through 1724. He was promoted to rōjū in 1724 when he moved from Kyoto to Edo.

Notes

References
 Screech, Timon. (2006). Secret Memoirs of the Shoguns: Isaac Titsingh and Japan, 1779–1822. London: RoutledgeCurzon. 

Fudai daimyo
Officials of the Tokugawa shogunate
Kyoto Shoshidai
Rōjū
1661 births
1728 deaths
Fujii-Matsudaira clan